Alive & Kickin' & Screamin' & Shoutin' is a live album released in 2005 by the 1970s art rock band Audience. It was the first album following the band's break-up in 1972. It includes three original members of the band, Howard Werth, Keith Gemmell and Trevor Williams, with the new drummer John Fisher in place of Tony Connor.

Included five tracks from three Audience albums:
Your Not Smiling, House on the Hill & I Had a Dream from "House on the Hill", Leave It Unsaid from "Audience" and Nothin' You Do from "Friends Friends Friend". Zig Zag & Swirl was from a Howard Werth solo album, Call Me Responsible was all Keith Gemmell and the other three were covers from the Beatles (I Wanna Be Your Man), Billy Ward (The Bells) & Tim Rose (Morning Dew).

Track listing

References 

2005 live albums
Audience (band) albums